The 2014–15 CERS Cup was the 35th season of the CERS Cup, Europe's second club roller hockey competition organized by CERH. Thirty-two teams from eight national associations qualified for the competition as a result of their respective national league placing in the previous season.

Teams 
Thirty-two teams from eight national associations qualified for the competition.

Preliminary phase 
The preliminary phase legs took place on 18 October and 1 November 2014.

|}

Knockout phase

Final-Four

Semi-finals

Final

See also
2014–15 CERH European League
2014–15 CERH Women's European League

References

External links
 CERH website
  Roller Hockey links worldwide
  Mundook-World Roller Hockey

World Skate Europe Cup
CERS Cup
CERS Cup